Albert Edward Talbot (18 August 1877 – 8 July 1936)  was Dean of Sydney from 1912 until his death.

He was educated at Manchester Grammar School and Emmanuel College, Cambridge and  ordained in 1905. His first post was as a curate at Whalley Range. Then he was  a Lecturer at the Church Mission College in Islington. His final appointment before leaving for Australia was at Rector of Stowell Memorial Church, Weaste.

References

People educated at Manchester Grammar School
Alumni of Emmanuel College, Cambridge
Deans of Sydney
1877 births
1936 deaths